Olbramovice is a municipality and village in Benešov District in the Central Bohemian Region of the Czech Republic. It has about 1,400 inhabitants.

Administrative parts
The central village is made up of two administrative parts: Olbramovice Městečko and Olbramovice Ves. Villages of Babice, Dvůr Semtín, Kochnov, Křešice, Mokřany, Podolí, Radotín, Semtín, Semtínek, Slavkov, Tomice II, Veselka and Zahradnice are also administrative parts of Olbramovice.

References

Villages in Benešov District